Lau Jun Jun is a Hongkonger footballer who plays as a forward. She has been a member of the Hong Kong women's national team.

International career 
Lau Jun Jun capped for Hong Kong at senior level during the 2008 AFC Women's Asian Cup qualification.

See also 
 List of Hong Kong women's international footballers

References

External links

Living people
Hong Kong women's footballers
Women's association football forwards
Hong Kong women's international footballers
Year of birth missing (living people)